Pine Hill is a former rural locality in the Barcaldine Region, Queensland, Australia.

On 22 November 2019 the Queensland Government decided to amalgamate the localities in the Barcaldine Region, resulting in five expanded localities based on the larger towns: Alpha, Aramac, Barcaldine, Jericho and Muttaburra. Pine Hill was incorporated into Alpha.

Geography 

The Central Western railway line forms the southern boundary of the locality with the Capricorn Highway forming the eastern part of the southern boundary.

The Drummond Range forms the western part of the locality. A number of creeks rise in the slopes of the range and flow variously west and north, all eventually becoming tributaries of the Belyando River within the North East Coast drainage basin.

The predominant land use is grazing on native vegetation.

History 

The Central Western railway line reached Pine Hill in 1883 with the Pinehill railway station at  its terminus. The station buildings were completed in July 1883. According to the Queensland Railways Department, the railway station was so named because of the surrounding ridges were once covered in cypress pine.

On August 1883 there was a land sale for 56 town lots and 180 country lots at Pine Hill. The sale was successful yielding  with buyers planning to build hotels and shops in the new town, although the newspaper of the day speculated that the land might be worthless in two years (presumably in the expectation that Pine Hill would not remain the terminus). The railway line opened 1 November 1883. The Queensland National Bank relocated their business from Bogantungan (the previous terminus) to Pine Hill in November 1883. The town was described in December 1883 as:"There is dust everywhere, not only in the streets but in the houses.You breathe it, you eat it, you drink it, you sniff it, touch what you will it is there. It sometimes almost blinds you, and it will no doubt assist in producing premature deafness in some cases, for your ears get filled with dust and thus all the five senses are affected ... it ought to have been named The Dust Flat".On 22 September 1884 the railway line had reached its new terminus Alpha and Pine Hill was described as "unsuited for permanent settlement". There was criticism of the Queensland Government for profiting from land sales in short-lived terminus towns like Pine Hill.

Pine Hill State School opened circa 1884 but closed in 1905. It reopened on 25 January 1926 but closed circa 1946.

Although the town's streets and allotments can still be seen on maps, there is no evidence of any building there today. The town was to the immediate south of the railway station in what is now the northernmost part of the Port Wine locality.

Education 
There are no schools in Pine Hill. The nearest primary school is in Alpha. The nearest secondary school is in Alpha but only to Year 10. The nearest secondary school to Year 12 is in Emerald. Boarding schools and distance education are other options.

References 

Barcaldine Region
Unbounded localities in Queensland